The 2021 Stockholm Open was a professional men's tennis tournament played on indoor hard courts. It was the 52nd edition of the tournament, and part of the ATP Tour 250 series of the 2021 ATP Tour. It took place at the Kungliga tennishallen in Stockholm, Sweden from 7 to 13 November 2021. Unseeded Tommy Paul won the singles title.

Finals

Singles

  Tommy Paul defeated  Denis Shapovalov, 6–4, 2–6, 6–4
Paul won his first ATP Tour title.

Doubles

  Santiago González /  Andrés Molteni defeated  Aisam-ul-Haq Qureshi /  Jean-Julien Rojer 6–2, 6–2.

Singles main-draw entrants

Seeds

 Rankings were as of November 1, 2021

Other entrants
The following players received wildcards into the singles main draw:
  Leo Borg 
  Andy Murray 
  Elias Ymer

The following players received entry from the qualifying draw:
  Viktor Durasovic
  Denis Istomin
  Pavel Kotov
  Andrea Vavassori

The following players received entry as lucky losers:
  Egor Gerasimov
  Jozef Kovalík
  Nino Serdarušić

Withdrawals
Before the tournament
  Nikoloz Basilashvili → replaced by  Tommy Paul
  Alex de Minaur → replaced by  Adrian Mannarino
  Grigor Dimitrov → replaced by  Arthur Rinderknech
  Cristian Garín → replaced by  Taylor Fritz
  Ugo Humbert → replaced by  Alejandro Davidovich Fokina
  Hubert Hurkacz → replaced by  Egor Gerasimov
  Aslan Karatsev → replaced by  Nino Serdarušić
  Gaël Monfils → replaced by  Márton Fucsovics
  Cameron Norrie → replaced by  Peter Gojowczyk
  Casper Ruud → replaced by  Mackenzie McDonald
  Diego Schwartzman → replaced by  Frances Tiafoe
  Lorenzo Sonego → replaced by  Jozef Kovalík
  Alexander Zverev → replaced by  Emil Ruusuvuori

Doubles main-draw entrants

Seeds

 Rankings were as of November 1, 2021

Other entrants
The following pairs received wildcards into the doubles main draw:
  Markus Eriksson /  Elias Ymer
  André Göransson /  Robert Lindstedt

The following pairs received entry into the doubles main draw as alternates:
  Karl Friberg /  Mohamed Safwat
  Simon Freund /  Nino Serdarušić

Withdrawals
Before the tournament
  Marcelo Arévalo /  Santiago González → replaced by  Santiago González /  Andrés Molteni 
  Simone Bolelli /  Máximo González → replaced by  Tomislav Brkić /  Nikola Ćaćić 
  Rohan Bopanna /  Denis Shapovalov → replaced by  Ariel Behar /  Gonzalo Escobar 
  Sander Gillé /  Joran Vliegen → replaced by  Emil Ruusuvuori /  Botic van de Zandschulp
  Wesley Koolhof /  Jean-Julien Rojer → replaced by  Aisam-ul-Haq Qureshi /  Jean-Julien Rojer 
  Raven Klaasen /  Ben McLachlan → replaced by  Fabrice Martin /  Hugo Nys
  Kevin Krawietz /  Horia Tecău → replaced by  Pedro Martínez /  Andrea Vavassori 
  Jamie Murray /  Bruno Soares → replaced by  Taylor Fritz /  Tommy Paul
  John Peers /  Filip Polášek → replaced by  Karl Friberg /  Mohamed Safwat
  Tim Pütz /  Michael Venus → replaced by  Simon Freund /  Nino Serdarušić

References

External links
 Official website 

 
Stockholm Open
Stockholm Open
2021 in Swedish tennis
Stockholm Open
2020s in Stockholm